In mathematics, inverse relation may refer to:

 Converse relation or "transpose"
 Negative relationship
 Inverse proportionality